Geoff Hunter (born Charles Michael Geoffrey Hunter on ) was an English cricketer. He was a right-handed batsman and a right-arm medium-pace bowler who played first-class cricket for the Minor Counties. He was born in Windle, St Helens, Lancashire.

Hunter made a single first-class appearance for the team, during an Indian tour of England in 1971.

Between 1968 and 1973, Hunter picked up five one-day appearances for Dorset and Minor Counties South.

External links
Geoffrey Hunter at Cricket Archive 

1937 births
Living people
Cricketers from St Helens, Merseyside
Dorset cricket captains
Dorset cricketers
English cricketers
Minor Counties cricketers